The Community of Literary Magazines and Presses (CLMP) is an American organization of independent literary publishers and magazines. It was founded  in 1967 by Robie Macauley, Reed Whittemore (The Carleton Miscellany, The New Republic); Jules Chametzky (The Massachusetts Review); George Plimpton (The Paris Review); and William Phillips (The Partisan Review) as the Coordinating Council of Literary Magazines (CCLM) at the suggestion of the National Endowment for the Arts, and renamed in 1989 as the Council of Literary Magazines and Presses. In April 2015, the organization took its current name.  it has about 350 members, half with a budget of less than $10,000. 

In 2000 CLMP Online was launched as an online resource providing technical assistance and information services for literary publishers and as an internet center for information about the field for readers, writers, media, and the general public.

Firecracker Awards
The Firecracker Awards are presented annually "to celebrate books and magazines that make a significant contribution to our literary culture and the publishers that strive to introduce important voices to readers far and wide."

The awards include five categories: fiction, creative nonfiction, poetry, best debut in magazine, and general excellence in magazine. In the book categories, winning presses receive $1,000-2,000, and authors or translators receive $1,000. Magazine winners receive $1,000 each. The winning titles are also showcased in CLMP's national publicity campaigns.

See also
List of literary magazines
Literary presses

References

External links

Magazine publishing